King Gcaleka KaPhalo (Born: 1728-Died: 1792) was the King of AmaXhosa Nation from 1775 to 1792. The third son of King Phalo kaTshiwo, he became King of the AmaXhosa Nation in 1775 right after his father died. King Gcaleka KaPhalo had 3 known sons, King Khawuta kaGcaleka (1761), Prince Velelo kaGcaleka and Prince Nqoko kaGcaleka. 

King Gcaleka KaPhalo faced tried to usurp his father's rule and interclan war broke out resulting in the Xhosa nation to split into two major sub-groups: the AmaXhosa of Rarabe and AmaXhosa of Gcaleka. To this day the AmaGcaleka lineage is recognised as the Royal house of the AmaXhosa nation.

King Gcaleka kaPhalo was succeeded by King Khawuta ka Gcaleka.

Other sources state he became King in 1750 and died in 1778.

References

1730 births
Gcaleka
Rulers of the Gcaleka
1792 deaths